Modesto Urrutibeazcoa (born 29 September 1959) is a Spanish former professional racing cyclist. He rode in two editions of the Tour de France.

References

External links
 

1959 births
Living people
Spanish male cyclists
People from Tolosaldea
Sportspeople from Gipuzkoa
Cyclists from the Basque Country (autonomous community)